Celeribacter naphthalenivorans is a Gram-negative, naphthalene-degrading, moderately halophilic, aerobic and motile bacterium from the genus of Celeribacter with a polar flagellum which has been isolated from tidal flat sediments from the South Sea in Korea.

References

Rhodobacteraceae
Bacteria described in 2015